Shirley G. Ringo (born October 29, 1940, Fort Collins, Colorado) was a Democratic Idaho State Representative since 2002 representing District 5 in the B seat since the 2012 redistrict, District 6 seat B prior to 2012.

Ringo previously served in the District 6 B seat from 1999 until 2000, and again from 2002 to 2014, when she unsuccessfully challenged incumbent Raúl Labrador for Idaho's 1st congressional district seat in the United States House of Representatives.

Early life, education, and career
Ringo graduated from John R. Rogers High School. She earned both her bachelor's and master's in mathematics from Washington State University.

Idaho House of Representatives

Committee assignments
2013-2014

Appropriations

Judiciary, Rules, and Administration

Transportation and Defense

Joint Finance- Appropriations

Joint Legislative Oversight

Election history

2014
In August 2013, Ringo announced she would not run for reelection to the Idaho Legislature and instead seek the Democratic nomination for U.S. House in Idaho's 1st congressional district. Ringo unsuccessfully challenged Republican incumbent Raúl Labrador, who won on November 4, 2014.

References

External links
 Shirley G. Ringo at the Idaho Legislature
 

1940 births
Living people
Democratic Party members of the Idaho House of Representatives
Politicians from Fort Collins, Colorado
People from Moscow, Idaho
Washington State University alumni
Washington State University faculty
Women state legislators in Idaho
1998 Idaho elections
American women academics
21st-century American women